Mikhail Vasilyevich Naumenko, better known as Mike Naumenko (18 April 1955 – 27 August 1991) was a Soviet rock musician, singer-songwriter and interpreter, leader of the band Zoopark.

Born in Leningrad, in the 1970s he was a member of the Russian rock group Aquarium, and in 1981 he formed Zoopark, which became one of the most outstanding blues rock groups of USSR. Naumenko is considered one of the best lyricists of Russian rock, although drawing heavily on Bob Dylan and other UK/US songwriters, and occasionally retaining the original melody as well. Some of Naumenko's songs are more or less faithful translations or remakes of English language source material (the notions of copyright and plagiarism being hardly established in the Soviet Union, especially as regards works created on the other side of the Iron Curtain). Largely imitative, Naumenko's input was yet very significant as he adapted the Western rock tradition to Russian culture and the urban realities of Leningrad.

Early years
Mikhail Naumenko studied at a "school with an intensive English-language program" in Leningrad, where he got his stage name, "Mike", presumably from his English teacher.

Naumenko became interested in music at the age of 8, when he heard a Beatles song for the first time from the street while he was standing on a balcony. The first rock bands that attracted his attention were The Beatles, The Rolling Stones, and Jefferson Airplane; also he collected magazine articles about T. Rex, The Doors and David Bowie.  At the age of 15, he started playing guitar and writing his first songs. The lyrics of his first songs were in English, but in 1972–1973 he switched to Russian under the influence of his close friend, Boris Grebenshchikov. Besides music, he had lifetime interests in aeromodeling and in translating from English to Russian, which also started while he was at school.

After he graduated from high school, having followed an advice from his father, Mike went to Saint-Petersburg State University of Architecture and Civil Engineering, but during his 4th year of study he lost interest in the subject and dropped out. He worked as a sound engineer in Bolshoi Puppet Theatre (Russian: Большой театр кукол), then as a watchman. All this time Mike remained a musician.

Naumenko started his musical career in little-known Leningrad rock bands, such as "Soyuz Lyubiteley Muzyki Rock" ("Union of Lovers of Rock-Music", Russian: "Союз любителей музыки рок") and "Vokalno-instrumentalnaya gruppirovka imeni Chacka Berry" ("Vocal-instrumental Band Named in Honor of Chuck Berry", Russian: "Вокально-инструментальная группировка им. Чака Берри"), which mostly played classical rock-n-roll songs from 1950s – 1970s. In the second half of 1970s, he performed with Aquarium, a prominent Leningrad rock band, as a guitarist.

In the summer of 1978, Naumenko and Boris Grebenshchikov (the leader of Aquarium) recorded an acoustic album "Vse brat'ya – sestry" ("All Brothers are Sisters", Russian: "Все братья – сестры"). The recording was done with a "Mayak-202", a serial soviet tape recorder, on the bank of Neva River in Leningrad. The themes of the songs were heavily influenced by the creative works of Bob Dylan. The only instruments used were a guitar and a harmonica, and the recording quality was far from perfect. However, many songs from this album later became very well known on the Russian rock scene.

Two years later, in the summer of 1980, Mike recorded his first solo album called "Sladkaya N i Drugie" ("Sweet N and Others", Russian: "Сладкая N и другие") with the help of Boris Grebenshchikov and Vyacheslav Zorin (guitar). The recording took place in the studio of Bolshoi Puppet Theatre. The total number of recorded songs was 32, however only 15 of them were included in the album. The album quickly became famous in Moscow, and Mike became recognizable as a "Bob Dylan from Leningrad".

Naumenko's lyrical muse has been identified as the Leningrad artist Tatyana Apraksina, as reflected in songs such as "Sweet N," "If It Rains," "Your River's Blues" and "Morning for Two". According to Naumenko, in a late interview, "All my songs are dedicated to her."

Zoopark 
In 1981, Naumenko organized the Zoopark rock band in which he was a lead vocalist and an art director until his death. With his band, he traveled a lot and visited many cities of the USSR.

Naumenko's vocals weren't great so he performed his songs in recitative style. He obtained popularity mostly because the lyrics of his songs were full of irony and satire. The majority of his songs were a first-person narrative, though, as he claimed in the interviews, it didn't mean that this person was himself.

The lyrics of Naumenko's songs were often translations or interpretations of the Western rock songs of Bob Dylan, Lou Reed or T. Rex. Sometimes he left the original melody intact too, e.g., one could compare "Zolotie Lvi" ("Golden Lions", "Золотые львы") and "Pozvoni mne rano utrom" ("Call Me Early in the Morning", "Позвони мне рано утром") with Dylan's "Idiot Wind" and "Meet Me in the Morning"; or "Ya lublu bugi-vugi" ("I love Boogie-Woogie", "Я люблю буги-вуги") with "I Love to Boogie". There was no "plagiarism"-related agenda in the specifics of USSR, thus Mike's "recipiency" was accepted as a way to digest the Western musical and lyrical traditions in the Russian way.

Late years and death 
In the late 1980s, Mike started facing troubles related to health and household issues, mainly due to alcohol abuse. The ability to move of his left hand deteriorated and he could hardly play the guitar. His wife also left him.

Naumenko died in Leningrad on 27 August 1991, at the age of 36, as a result of cerebral hemorrhage caused by an accident in his flat.

However, there's another version to the story. Zoopark's drummer Valeriy Kirillov states that the reason for Mike's death was cerebral hemorrhage, but it wasn't of a natural cause. The real reason was a fracture of the skull base that Mike received during a robbery attack near his house. This was allegedly confirmed by the fact that Mike's personal belongings were absent. Also, there was allegedly a witness who saw somebody help Mike get up from the ground. After the assault, Mike was able to get to his apartment where he eventually collapsed and laid unconscious without being noticed. When finally he was discovered and an ambulance was summoned, it was too late. However, many people who knew the details of his death don't confirm this version.

Naumenko was buried in Volkovo Cemetery, Saint Petersburg.

Legacy
Mike's memory has been honored with numerous tribute albums (see Discography below) and in other creative works including a 2009 novel and a "blues opera" that premiered in 2011. A collection of Naumenko's complete writings – including his samizdat translation of Richard Bach's Illusions  — was being prepared for publication in 2015.

He appears as a character in Leto, a 2018 Russian biographical film about Viktor Tsoi. Mike Naumenko is played by Roman Bilyk.

Discography

with Zoopark
 1981 — Blues de Moscou
 1983 — Uyezdny gorod N
 1984 — Belaya polosa
 1987 — Illyuzii
 1987 — Bugi‐Vugi Kazhdy Den
 1989 — W
 1991 — Muzyka dlya filma
 1996 — Legendy Russkogo roka
 1999 — The Best

Solo
 1978 — Vse bratya – sestry (with Boris Grebenshchikov)
 1980 — Sladkaya N i drugiye
 1982 — LV
 1985 — Zhizn v Zooparke
 1996 — Vesna‐leto (with Viktor Tsoi)
 1996 — 12–13 yanvarya 1985 goda, Moscow (with Viktor Tsoi)
 1997 — Kvartirnik (with Sergey Ryzhenko)
 1998 — Mike Naumenko. Viktor Tsoi (with Viktor Tsoi)
 1998 — Ispolneniye razresheno (with Boris Grebenshchikov and Viktor Tsoi)
 2009 — Leningrad 1984 (with Viktor Tsoi)
 2010 — 25 oktyabrya 1980 Moscow (with Aquarium)

Tributes
 1993 — Pesni Mayka
 1998 — Park Maykskogo perioda
 2000 — Remayk
 2001 — Rom i Pepsi‐kola (Dmitry Dibrov i "Antropologiya")
 2002 — Zoopark tribyut – Pesni Mayka
 2005 — Tribyut Mayku Naumenko, 50 let. Uyezdny gorod N 20 let spustya
 2008 — Gryaznye blyuzy (Aleksandr Dyomin)

References

External links
 Remike.spb.ru
 Майк Науменко.ru
 Mike-zoo.kiev.ua
 Майк и группа "Зоопарк"
 Poems at lib.ru

1955 births
1991 deaths
Musicians from Saint Petersburg
Russian rock singers
20th-century Russian singers
Soviet male singer-songwriters
20th-century Russian male singers